The Shaheed Benazir Bhutto International Boxing Tournament took place in the KPT Benazir Sports Complex in Karachi, Pakistan from 1–8 January 2010. Amir Khan, the professional British boxing world champion of Pakistani descent was the guest in the final rounds of tournament.

Pakistan Boxing Federation Organized the Event with the support of a Local Company, Media gurus run by Mr Umer Toor & his associates.

Participating countries

Results
Light Flyweight (48 kg): Mohib Bacha bt Nadir Baloch
Flyweight (51 kg): Anan Pongkhet bt Abdul Waheed
Bantamweight (54 kg): Yong Dang bt J Otgonbayar
Featherweight (57 kg): Donchai Thathi bt Wessam Salamana
Lightweight (60 kg): Ibrahim Sanda bt Adnan Hussain
Light Welterweight (64 kg): B Tuvshinbat bt Mashhurbek Ruziyev
Welterweight (69 kg): Mulema Joseph bt Ahmed B Jassem
Middleweight (75 kg): Moutafa Fara bt Sile Hu
Light Heavyweight (81 kg): Fanlong Meng bt Imre Szello
Heavyweight (91 kg): Xuan Bao bt Mustafa Mohammad
Super Heavyweight (+91): Heshuai Li bt Ghson Ahmad

Other activities
Nine African boxers belongs to Central Africa Republic and Cameron embraced Islam while staying in city.

References

External links
Media Gallery of Benazir Bhutto boxing final
China crowned champions, humiliation for Pakistan

International sports competitions hosted by Pakistan
Sport in Karachi
Boxing in Pakistan
2010 in Pakistani sport
2010s in Karachi